Boxholms IF is a Swedish football club located in Boxholm.

Background
Boxholms IF currently plays in Division 4 Östergötland Västra which is the sixth tier of Swedish football. They play their home matches at the Svartåvallen in Boxholm.

Boxholms IF are affiliated to Östergötlands Fotbollförbund.

Season to season

In their most successful period Boxholms IF competed in the following divisions:

In recent seasons Boxholms IF have competed in the following divisions:

Footnotes

External links
 Boxholms IF – Official website

Sport in Östergötland County
Football clubs in Östergötland County
Association football clubs established in 1905
1905 establishments in Sweden